James Hackett may refer to:

 James Hackett (businessman) (born 1955), CEO of Ford Motor Company
 James K. Hackett (actor) (1869–1926), American actor 
 James Hackett (shipbuilder) (1739–1802), American master shipbuilder
 James William Hackett (1929–2015), American haiku poet
 Jim Hackett (1877–1961), American baseball player
 James Henry Hackett (1800–1871), American actor
 James Hackett (Anadarko CEO), American petroleum executive